An ohmic plasma is a plasma that is maintained and/or replenished by the heat produced when a plasma current flows through its resistance as in the induced poloidal magnetic field of a tokamak. Efficiency decreases as the plasma temperature increases. The mechanism is similar to the heat created with an electric current flowing through a resistance (ohmic).

Related terms and topics

 Spitzer resistivity
 Alfvén wave
 Tokamak

References

External links
 Heating the plasma—RESEARCH FOR TOMORROW'S ENERGY SUPPLY
 Poloidal Field
 Institute for Plasma Physics (IPP-Max Planck) - Ohmic Heating

Plasma physics